Lehaq (also Romanized as Leḩāq) is a village in Qarah Su Rural District, Meshgin-e Sharqi District, Meshgin Shahr County, Ardabil Province, Iran. At the 2006 census, its population was 405, in 117 families.

References 

Towns and villages in Meshgin Shahr County